Sneh Bhargava is an Indian radiologist, medical academic and a former director and Professor Emeritus of the All India Institute of Medical Sciences, New Delhi. Born in 1930, she is a former vice president and an elected Fellow of the National Academy of Sciences, India, one of the premier scientific societies in India. She has delivered several keynote addresses and has been part of medical ethics related investigations of the Medical Council of India. After superannuation from AIIMS, she works at Dharamshilla Nrayana Superspeciality hospital Mayur Vihar Phase 3, New Delhi. The Government of India awarded her the fourth highest civilian award of the Padma Shri, in 1991. She played a major role in the unsuccessful attempt to revive Indira Gandhi right after the latter's assassination attempt.

See also

 All India Institute of Medical Sciences Delhi
 National Academy of Sciences, India

References

Recipients of the Padma Shri in medicine
1930 births
Indian medical academics
Indian radiologists
Fellows of The National Academy of Sciences, India
Indian medical administrators
Living people
Fellows of the National Academy of Medical Sciences
20th-century Indian medical doctors
Academic staff of the All India Institute of Medical Sciences, New Delhi
Directors of the All India Institute of Medical Sciences, New Delhi